Norman Henry Hallam (23 October 1920 – 1997) was an English footballer. A half-back, he helped Port Vale to finish second in the Third Division North in 1952–53. Whilst at the club he became a Methodist minister. He later played for Halifax Town and Goole Town.

Career
Hallam played for Chelsea, before joining Port Vale in May 1946. He played 27 first team games in 1946–47, scoring his first senior goal on 9 November, in a 4–1 defeat to Walsall at Fellows Park. He scored three goals in 30 games in 1947–48. He quit full-time football in July 1948 to become a Methodist Minister, but played one Third Division South game in 1949–50. At the end of the 1950–51 season he conducted the funeral of Gordon Hodgson, his former manager at Vale Park. Hallam re-joined the "Valiants" in January 1952, although did not play regularly, as living in Birmingham he couldn't always make it to matches. He played three games in 1951–52 and eight games in 1952–53, helping Freddie Steele's side to finish second in the Third Division North in the latter campaign. In May 1953, he moved house to Doncaster and left the club on a free transfer to Halifax Town. He played three games for the "Shaymen" in 1953–54. After leaving The Shay, he later played for Goole Town.

Career statistics
Source:

Honours
Port Vale
Football League Third Division North second-place promotion: 1952–53

References

1920 births
1997 deaths
People from Longton, Staffordshire
Footballers from Stoke-on-Trent
English Methodist ministers
English footballers
Association football midfielders
Chelsea F.C. players
Port Vale F.C. players
Halifax Town A.F.C. players
Goole Town F.C. players
English Football League players